The 1963 Sudbury and Woodbridge by-election was held in 1963 after the previous Conservative MP, John Hare was elevated to the House of Lords.

References

Sudbury
1963 elections in the United Kingdom
1963 in England